Jacob's Well is a perennial karstic spring in the Texas Hill Country flowing from the bed of Cypress Creek, located northwest of Wimberley, Texas.

Description
The spring is located on the property of Jacob's Well Natural Area (JWNA), managed by the Hays County Parks Department. The visitor entrance for JWNA is located at 1699 Mt. Sharp Road in Wimberley, Texas. The  diameter mouth of the spring serves as a popular local swimming spot.

Due to development in the area, the level of the Trinity Aquifer has dropped, affecting the flow of water through Jacob's Well. In the modern era, what remains visible of the spring is a faint ripple on the surface of Cypress Creek. The spring ceased flowing for the first time in recorded history in 2000, again ceasing to flow in 2008, 2011, 2013 and 2022. This resulted in now ongoing measures to address local water conservation and quality. Hays County purchased  of land around Jacob's Well in 2010, in an attempt to protect the spring from development. An additional thirty-one acres was transferred to the county from the neighboring Jacob’s Well Natural Area (administered at the time by the Wimberley Valley Watershed Association (WVWA)), the new, eighty-acre (32 hectares) named the Westridge Tract.

The system has been explored and mapped by cave divers of the  Jacob's Well Exploration Project and has been shown to consist of two principal conduits.

The cave is also an attraction for open-water divers, some of whom are inexperienced with the specialized techniques and equipment used in cave diving, which has resulted in nine fatalities at this site between 1964 and 1984 (eight men and one woman).

References

External links 

Jacob's Well Exploration Project 
Jacob's Well Natural Area
Hill Country Outdoor Guide: Jacob's Well Natural Area 
The Hydrology and Biology of Cypress Creek (Hays County), a Subtropical Karstic Stream in South Central Texas 
Austin American Statesman: 50 acres added to Jacob's Well
Horseback Magazine Online: Iconic Jacob’s Well Saved From Development in Texas
Texas Tribune: Texas Debates Who Owns Its Water
Texas Observer: The End of the Hill Country
Alternet: Behind Texas's Looming Crisis: Groundwater Scarcity 
Texas Living Waters Project: Jacob's Well Stops Flowing (PDF)
The Fatal Allure of JACOB'S WELL

Caves of Texas
Karst springs
Springs of Texas
Landforms of Hays County, Texas
Limestone formations of the United States
Nature reserves in Texas
Protected areas of Hays County, Texas